The following is a list of notable deaths in January 2013.

Entries for each day are listed alphabetically by surname. A typical entry lists information in the following sequence:
Name, age, country of citizenship and reason for notability, established cause of death, reference.

January 2013

1
Moses Anderson, 84, American Roman Catholic prelate, Auxiliary Bishop of Detroit (1983–2003), cardiac arrest.
Lory Blanchard, 88, New Zealand rugby league player and coach.
Robert J. Callahan, 82, American jurist, Chief Justice of the Connecticut Supreme Court (1996–1999), Parkinson's disease.
Michael Patrick Cronan, 61, American graphic designer and artist, named TiVo, Amazon Kindle, colon cancer.
Jack Davis, 80, American football player (Boston Patriots).
Ross Davis, 94, American Negro league baseball player.
Lucio Dell'Angelo, 74, Italian footballer.
Paul du Feu, 77, Welsh painter, builder, cartoonist and model.
Bruce Eisner, 64, American writer, gastrointestinal hemorrhage.
Lloyd Hartman Elliott, 94, American educator, President of George Washington University (1965–1988).
Avrohom Yaakov Friedman, 84, Austrian–born Israeli rabbi.
Hugh Gillis, 94, American politician, member of the Georgia House of Representatives (1950–1962) and Senate (1962–2004).
Allan Hancox, 80, British-born Kenyan justice, Chief Justice (1989–1993).
Roz Howard, 91, American racing driver.
Christopher Martin-Jenkins, 67, British cricket journalist (Test Match Special, The Cricketer) and BBC radio commentator, cancer.
Alois Moser, 82, Canadian Olympic ski jumper (1960).
Louis J. Nigro, Jr., 65, American diplomat, cancer.
Patti Page, 85, American singer ("Tennessee Waltz", "Confess") and actress (Elmer Gantry), heart and lung disease.
Slobodan Rakitić, 72, Serbian writer and politician.
Mojtaba Tehrani, 79, Iranian Twelver Marja'.
Brihaspati Dev Triguna, 92, Indian traditional healer.
Barbara Werle, 84, American actress (Battle of the Bulge, Charro!, The Virginian).
Phyllis Wiener, 91, American artist.
Zhang Wenbin, 93, Chinese politician, Vice Minister of the Petroleum Industry (1965–1987).
Wendell Young III, 76, American labor leader, Liver cancer

2
Yuri Alexandrov, 49, Russian boxer, heart attack.
Charles W. Blackwell, 70, American Chickasaw Nation diplomat, Ambassador to the United States (since 1995).
Wren Blair, 87, Canadian ice hockey coach and manager (Minnesota North Stars, Pittsburgh Penguins).
Beatrice Bolam, 93, English politician and magistrate.
Jim Boyd, 79, American actor (The Electric Company).
Margaret A. Brewer, 82, American USMC brigadier general.
Council Cargle, 77, American stage and film actor (Jackie Brown, Detroit 9000).
Karel Čáslavský, 75, Czech film historian and television host, pneumonia.
Charles Chilton, 95, British BBC Radio writer, producer and presenter (Journey into Space), pneumonia.
Angelo Coia, 74, American football player (Chicago Bears, Washington Redskins, Atlanta Falcons).
John Commins, 71, South African cricketer.
Lee Eilbracht, 88, American baseball coach (University of Illinois) (1952–1978).
Zaharira Harifai, 83, Israeli actress, cancer.
Merv Hunter, 86, Australian politician, New South Wales MLA for Lake Macquarie (1969–1991).
Géza Koroknay, 64, Hungarian actor.
Gerda Lerner, 92, Austrian-born American feminist historian.
Ladislao Mazurkiewicz, 67, Uruguayan footballer, respiratory illness.
Joe McGrath, Irish Gaelic football and hurling coach (Cork).
Ian McKeever, 42, Irish mountaineer and Seven Summits record holder, lightning strike.
Maulvi Nazir, 37–38, Pakistani militant commander, drone strike.
Susan Nolen-Hoeksema, 53, American psychologist and author, complications from heart surgery.
Jamie Oglesby, 84, American politician.
Kishore Pawar, 86, Indian political and trade union leader.
Stephen Resnick, 74, American economist, leukemia.
Alexei Rudeanu, 73, Romanian writer.
Richard Shenton, 86, Jersey politician.
Renzo Soldani, 87, Italian cyclist.
Rudolf Szanwald, 81, Austrian footballer (Wiener Sport-Club).
Teresa Torańska, 69, Polish journalist (Gazeta Wyborcza) and writer.
Wen-Ying Tsai, 84, Chinese–born American artist.
Ned Wertimer, 89, American actor (The Jeffersons, Pirates of the Caribbean: At World's End), complications from a fall.

3
Lars T. Bjella, 90, Norwegian politician.
Sir Robert Clark, 88, British naval officer and businessman.
George Falconer, 66, Scottish footballer (Dundee, Raith Rovers), heart attack.
Alfie Fripp, 98, British RAF airman, longest-serving British POW during World War II.
Ted Godwin, 79, Canadian artist, complications from heart attack.
M. S. Gopalakrishnan, 81, Indian violinist.
Marianne Grunberg-Manago, 91, Russian-born French biochemist.
Jimmy Halliday, 85, Scottish politician, National Chairman of the Scottish National Party (1956–1960).
Robert C. Holland, 87, American economist, member of Federal Reserve Board of Governors (19731976), dementia.
 Kanang anak Langkau, 67, Malaysian soldier, Seri Pahlawan Gagah Perkasa recipient, heart attack.
Richard A. Long, 85, American author and historian.
Ivan Mackerle, 70, Czech cryptozoologist.
William Maxson, 82, American military commander, complications from heart surgery.
John McAndrew, 85,  Gaelic footballer.
Preben Munthe, 90, Norwegian economist.
Sergiu Nicolaescu, 82, Romanian film director (Michael the Brave), actor (A Police Superintendent Accuses) and Senator (1992–2004, 2008–2012), cardiac arrest.
Andrew P. O'Rourke, 79, American politician and judge (New York Supreme Court).
Jaime Ortiz-Patino, 82, French-born Spanish golf promoter, creator of Valderrama Golf Club, President of the World Bridge Federation (1976–1986).
Shikaripura Ranganatha Rao, 90, Indian archeologist.
Vladimir Sargsyan, 77, Armenian scientist.
Hisayuki Sasaki, 48, Japanese golfer, cardiac arrest.
Thomas Schäuble, 64, German politician, complications following a heart attack.
Selkirk, 24, English champion racehorse (Queen Elizabeth II Stakes, Celebration Mile, Lockinge Stakes), natural causes.
Patty Shepard, 67, American-born Spanish movie actress, heart attack.
Burry Stander, 25, South African Olympic (2008, 2012) mountain biker, traffic collision.
Paul Taff, 92, American television executive and executive producer (Mister Rogers' Neighborhood, The French Chef).

4
Mohammad Aeltemesh, 64, Indian lawyer.
Bashir Ahmed, 88, Indian cricketer.
Sir Geoffrey de Bellaigue, 81, British Surveyor of the Queen's Works of Art (1972–1996).
Bhanumati Devi, 78, Burmese-born Indian actress (Matira Manisha), heart failure.
Frank Eke, 81, Nigerian medical doctor and politician.
Pete Elliott, 86, American Hall of Fame college football player (Michigan), Executive Director of the Pro Football Hall of Fame (1979–1995).
Ed Emory, 75, American football coach (East Carolina University, 1980–1984).
Wally Feurzeig, 85, American computer scientist, invented Logo.
Pir Gohar, 81, Pakistani poet, songwriter, critic and freedom activist, cardiac arrest.
Murray Henderson, 91, Canadian hockey player (Boston Bruins).
Thomas Holtzmann, 85, German stage and film actor.
Nilmar Janbu, 91, Norwegian engineer and geotechnician.
Sammy Johns, 66, American singer-songwriter ("Chevy Van", "America").
Derek Kevan, 77, English footballer (West Bromwich Albion).
Salik Lucknawi, 99, Indian Urdu poet.
Tony Lip, 82, American actor (Donnie Brasco, Goodfellas, The Sopranos).
Vittorio Missoni, 58, Italian fashion designer, CEO of Missoni, plane crash.
Lassaâd Ouertani, 32, Tunisian footballer, traffic collision.
Yevgeny Pepelyaev, 94, Russian Soviet-era fighter pilot, Korean War flying ace.
Robert Phelps, 86, American mathematician. 
Nikos Samaras, 42, Greek volleyball player, brain aneurysm.
Gene Segerblom, 94, American politician, member of the Nevada State Assembly (1992–2000).
Şenay, 62, Turkish singer, respiratory failure.
Anwar Shamim, 81, Pakistani Air Force air marshal, Chief of Air Staff (1978–1985).
Amanda Stassart, 89, Belgian resistance member.
Bryan Stoltenberg, 40, American football player (San Diego Chargers, Carolina Panthers), injuries sustained in traffic collision.
Sándor Szoboszlai, 87, Hungarian actor.
Jim Watson, 95, English politician, Mayor of Blackburn (1982–1983), pneumonia.
Zoran Žižić, 61, Montenegrin politician, Prime Minister of the Federal Republic of Yugoslavia (2000–2001).

5
Haradhan Bandopadhyay, 86, Indian actor, pneumonia.
Piet de Bekker, 91, Dutch politician.
Gwendoline Butler, 90, British author.
Anders Carlberg, 69, Swedish politician, writer and social worker.
Pierre Cogan, 98, French racing cyclist.
T. S. Cook, 65, American screenwriter (The China Syndrome), cancer.
Willi Dreesen, 84, Swiss painter and sculptor.
Dave Edwards, 74, American politician, member of the Wyoming House of Representatives (2000–2008), complications from a stroke.
Trygve Goa, 87, Norwegian printmaker.
Martha Greenhouse, 91, American stage and television actress, Screen Actors Guild official.
Abraham Hecht, 90, American rabbi and sect leader.
Joselo, 76, Venezuelan actor, liver illness.
Leung Ping-kwan, 63, Hong Kong poet, novelist, essayist, translator, teacher, and scholar, lung cancer.
Jeff Lewis, 39, American football player (Carolina Panthers, Denver Broncos), accidental drug overdose.
Ann-Britt Leyman, 90, Swedish Olympic athlete.
Bruce McCarty, 92, American architect.
Mary Susan McIntosh, 76, British sociologist, feminist and political activist, stroke.
Richard McWilliam, 59, American entrepreneur, co-founder of Upper Deck Company, alcohol poisoning.
Fitzroy Newsum, 94, American military pilot (Tuskegee Airmen).
Joe Padilla, 48, American baseball umpire.
Joseph-Aurèle Plourde, 97, Canadian Roman Catholic prelate, Archbishop of Ottawa (19671989).
Fay Bellamy Powell, 74, American civil rights activist.
Claude Préfontaine, 79, Canadian comedian.
Thomas Schmidt-Kowalski, 63, German composer.
Marie-Hélène Schwartz, 99, French mathematician.
Harry Searson, 88, English footballer (Leeds United, York City), cancer.
Vladimir Šenauer, 82, Croatian footballer.
Chandler Williams, 27, American football player (Toronto Argonauts).
Sol Yurick, 87, American author (The Warriors), lung cancer.

6
Neil Adcock, 81, South African cricketer, bowel cancer.
Qazi Hussain Ahmad, 74, Pakistani politician, Ameer of Jamaat-e-Islami (1987–2009), cardiac arrest.
Cho Sung-min, 39, South Korean baseball player (Yomiuri Giants), suicide by hanging.
Paul Grundy, 77, Australian civil engineer and academic.
Gerard Helders, 107, Dutch politician, Minister of Colonial Affairs (1957–1959), Member of the Council of State (1959–1975), nation's oldest living man (since 2012), natural causes.
John Ingram, 83, American politician, North Carolina Commissioner of Insurance (1973–1985), heart attack.
Metin Kaçan, 51, Turkish novelist, suicide by jumping.
Jon Ander López, 36, Spanish footballer, heart attack.
Jeffrey O'Connell, 84, American legal expert, professor and attorney, champion of no-fault insurance.
Madanjeet Singh, 88, Indian diplomat, artist, writer and philanthropist, stroke.
Luigi Spaventa, 78, Italian politician and academic, MP (1976–1983), Minister of Treasury (1988–1989), Minister of Budget (1993–1994).
Ruth Carter Stevenson, 89, American museum founder, President of the Amon Carter Museum.
Myron Stolaroff, 92, American psychedelic researcher.
Bart Van den Bossche, 48, Belgian singer and television presenter, aortic aneurysm.
Roy Walker, 81, British production designer (Barry Lyndon, The Shining, The Talented Mr. Ripley), Oscar winner (1976).
Dalia Wood, 88, Canadian politician.

7
Nancy Burley, 82, Australian Olympic figure skater.
Larry Clapp, 66, American politician, member of Wyoming House of Representatives  (19781979), suicide by gunshot.
Stanley Cohen, 70, British sociologist, Parkinson's disease.
Jim Cosman, 69, American baseball player (St. Louis Cardinals, Chicago Cubs), Alzheimer's disease.
Richard Ben Cramer, 62, American journalist, author (What It Takes: The Way to the White House) and Pulitzer Prize winner (1979), lung cancer.
Maria de Fátima Silva de Sequeira Dias, 54, Portuguese Azorean historian and academic.
Birck Elgaaen, 95, Norwegian Olympic equestrian.
David R. Ellis, 60, American stuntman (Lethal Weapon, Scarface) and film director (Snakes on a Plane).
Jeremy Hindley, 69, British horse trainer, motor neurone disease.
Huell Howser, 67, American television personality (California's Gold) and actor (Winnie the Pooh), prostate cancer.
Ada Louise Huxtable, 91, American architecture critic (Wall Street Journal) and Pulitzer Prize winner (1970), cancer.
Kabir Ahmad Jaisi, 78, Indian academic.
Jiřina Jirásková, 81, Czech actress and UNICEF Czech Committee President (20022011).
Maruša Krese, 65, Slovene poet, writer and journalist.
Louise Laurin, 77, Canadian educator and activist.
Mary Madkour, 85, American politician.
Epifanie Norocel, 80, Romanian archbishop of Buzău and Vrancea, myocardial infarction.
Gonzalo Puyat II, 79, Filipino sport administrator and politician, President of FIBA (1976–1984), cardiac arrest.
Joseph Roney, 77, Haitian politician.
Harvey Shapiro, 88, American poet and newspaper editor (The New York Times), complications from surgery.
Fred L. Turner, 80, American restaurant industry executive, CEO of McDonald's (19741987), Chairman (19771987), complications of pneumonia.
Dorothy Vest, 93, American tennis player.
Nadeane Walker, 91, American journalist, fashion editor and foreign correspondent (Associated Press, International Herald Tribune).
Zvi Yavetz, 87, Romanian-born Israeli historian and Israel Prize winner (1990).

8
Asbjørn Aarnes, 89, Norwegian literary historian.
Tandyn Almer, 70, American musician.
Kenojuak Ashevak, 85, Canadian Inuit artist, lung cancer.
Mike Brannan, 57, American golf player, kidney cancer.
Bernard Delcampe, 80, French footballer.
Matthew Dickens, 51, American actor and choreographer (The Aviator, Rent, Dreamgirls), cancer.
Antonio Frasconi, 93, Argentine-born American woodcut artist and educator.
Otto Hornung, 92, Czech philatelist and journalist.
Jeanne Manford, 92, American gay rights activist.
Shirley Matthews, 70, Canadian pop singer.
Alasdair Milne, 82, British television producer, Director-General of the BBC (1982–1987), stroke.
Manuel Mota, 46, Spanish fashion designer, suicide.
Watson Parker, 88, American historian and author, specialist on the Black Hills.
Cornel Pavlovici, 70, Romanian footballer (Steaua București), Liga I top scorer in 1964.
Ole A. Sæther, 76, Norwegian entomologist.
Ten Most Wanted, 12, American thoroughbred racehorse, winner of Travers Stakes (2003).
A. K. Warder, 88, Canadian academic.
Percy White, 96, British chemist and nuclear scientist.

9
Werner Altegoer, 77, German businessman and football administrator (VfL Bochum).
Brigitte Askonas, 89, Austrian-born British immunologist.
Samuel E. Blum, 92, American chemist and physicist.
Vivian Brown, 85, American media personality.
James M. Buchanan, 93, American economist, Nobel Prize (1986).
Sakine Cansız, 54-55, Turkish Kurdish activist (Kurdistan Workers' Party), shooting.
Peter Carson, 74, English publisher, editor and translator.
Anscar Chupungco, 73, Filipino Benedictine monk and liturgist.
Juan Curet, 84, Puerto Rican Olympic boxer.
Frank Esposito, 84, American politician, Mayor of Norwalk, Connecticut (1987–2001).
Jim Godbolt, 90, British jazz writer and historian.
Hoàng Hiệp, 81, Vietnamese songwriter.
Charly Jacobs, 64, Belgian footballer
Katchit, 9, Irish Thoroughbred hurdler, colic.
Tarsem King, Baron King of West Bromwich, 75, British Labour politician and peer, suspected heart attack.
Ralph G. Martin, 92, American journalist.
Rizana Nafeek, 24, Sri Lankan domestic helper, convicted of murder in Saudi Arabia, execution by beheading.
Edward Odell, 65, American mathematician.
Frank Page, 87, American radio personality (KWKH).
Willis Page, 94, American symphony orchestra conductor.
Robert L. Rock, 85, American politician, Lieutenant Governor of Indiana (1965–1969).
Rex Trailer, 84, American television host (Boomtown, WBZ-TV) and musician, pneumonia.
John Wise, 77, Canadian politician, MP for Elgin (1972–1988); Minister of Agriculture (1979–1980; 1984–1988).

10
Christel Adelaar, 77, Dutch actress, lung cancer.
Delmo Alberghini, 90, American athlete.
Antonino Calderone, 77, Italian criminal, Sicilian Mafioso.
Geoffrey Coates, 95, English chemist.
Evan S. Connell, 88, American novelist, poet, and short story-writer.
Ted Cooke-Yarborough, 94, English physicist and engineer.
James Draper, 87, South African cricket umpire.
Bob Fenton, 89, New Zealand politician, MP for Hastings (1975–1978).
Peter Fitz, 81, German stage and film actor.
Trevor Gordon, 64, British–born Australian singer (The Marbles).
George Gruntz, 80, Swiss jazz musician.
Jay Handlan, 84, American basketball player (Washington and Lee University, Akron Goodyear Wingfoots).
Michael Hofbauer, 49, Czech film actor, cancer.
Karl-Erik Israelsson, 83, Swedish long jumper.
Luigi Kuveiller, 85, Italian cinematographer.
Franz Lehrndorfer, 84, German organist.
Daniel McCarthy, 86, Canadian television producer (The Friendly Giant, Mr. Dressup, Sesame Park).
Claude Nobs, 76, Swiss founder and general manager of Montreux Jazz Festival, complications from skiing accident.
Lucien Poirier, 94, French Army general.
Jean R. Preston, 77, American politician and teacher, member of the North Carolina General Assembly (1992–2012), complications from a fall.
Jorge Selarón, 65, Chilean-born Brazilian painter and ceramist (Escadaria Selarón).
Vincent Sombrotto, 89, American union official, president of NALC (19782002).
Zhang Yongming, 56, Chinese murderer, executed.

11
Thomas Bourgin, 26, French motorcycle racer, traffic collision.
Gordon Chavunduka, 81, Zimbabwean sociologist and traditional healer.
Dave Chisnall, 64, English rugby league player (Warrington Wolves).
Guido Forti, 72, Italian motor racing team owner.
Claude Fredericks, 89, American playwright and memoirist.
Siegfried Gerstner, 96, German army officer, awarded Knight's Cross of the Iron Cross.
Sam Halloin, 89, American politician, longest-serving mayor of Green Bay, Wisconsin (1979–1995).
Brian Heffel, 68, Canadian Olympic wrestler.
D. Brainerd Holmes, 91, American aeronautics executive, NASA Director of Manned Space Flight (19611963), complications from pneumonia.
Sergei Issakov, 81, Estonian literary scholar, politician, and professor.
Corinne Jacker, 79, American playwright and screenwriter.
Robert Kee, 93, British writer, journalist and broadcaster.
Liz Lands, 73, American soul singer.
Paul J. Lunardi, 91, American politician.
James Charles Macnab of Macnab, 86, Scottish aristocrat, chief of Clan MacNab.
Ba Mamadou Mbaré, 67, Mauritanian politician, President of the Senate (since 2007), Interim President (2009).
Mariangela Melato, 71, Italian actress (Swept Away, Flash Gordon, So Fine), pancreatic cancer.
Khushi Murali, 49, Indian pop singer, cardiac arrest.
*Nguyễn Khánh, 85, Vietnamese politician and military leader, President of South Vietnam (1964–1965), illnesses related to diabetes.
Tatsuji Nomura, 90, Japanese scientist.
Jimmy O'Neill, 73, American disc jockey and television host (Shindig!), diabetes and heart complications.
Tom Parry Jones, 77, Welsh inventor (electronic breathalyser).
Murray Merle Schwartz, 81, American senior (former chief) judge (U.S. District Court for Delaware).
Alemayehu Shumye, 24, Ethiopian long-distance runner, traffic collision.
W. Reece Smith, Jr., 87, American lawyer and academic.
Aaron Swartz, 26, American programmer and internet activist, co-creator of Reddit, suicide by hanging.
Fred Talbot, 71, American baseball player (New York Yankees).
Billy Varga, 94, American professional wrestler and actor (Raging Bull), Alzheimer's disease.
Lars Werner, 77, Swedish politician, leader of the Left Party (1975–1993), heart failure.
John Wilkinson, 67, American rhythm guitarist (Elvis Presley's TCB Band), cancer.

12
Guy de Alwis, 53, Sri Lankan cricketer, cancer.
Gregory Victor Babic, 49, Australian writer.
Precious Bryant, 71, American blues and country musician, complications of diabetes and heart failure.
Anthony Cavendish, 85, English MI6 officer.
Flor María Chalbaud, 91, First Lady of Venezuela.
Harold Crowchild, 97, Canadian Tsuu T'ina elder and soldier, last Treaty 7 World War II veteran.
William J. Cullerton, 90, American fighter pilot, World War II flying ace.
Chuck Dalton, 85, Canadian basketball player, member of Olympic team (1952).
John Martin Darko, 67, Ghanaian Roman Catholic prelate, Bishop of Sekondi-Takoradi (1998–2011).
Helen Elliot, 85, Scottish table tennis player, world champion (1949 and 1950).
Harry Fearnley, 77, English footballer.
Emmett Forrest, 85, American collector, founder of the Andy Griffith Museum.
Bubba Harris, 86, American baseball player (Philadelphia Athletics, Cleveland Indians).
Jake Hartford, 63, American radio personality, heart attack.
Delilah Jackson, 84, American historian.
Jean Krier, 64, Luxembourgian poet.
Leon Leyson, 83, Polish-American Holocaust survivor.
Anna Lizaran, 68, Spanish actress, cancer.
William Andrew MacKay, 83, Canadian academic, President of Dalhousie University (19801986).
Hasan Mahdi, 76, Indian anatomist.
Walt McPherson, 96, American basketball coach (San Jose State University), Commissioner of the WCC (19651969).
Ourasi, 32, French Trotter harness racing horse, winner of Prix d'Amérique (1986–1988, 1990).
Eugene Patterson, 89, American newspaper editor (The Atlanta Journal-Constitution), Pulitzer Prize winner (1967), cancer.
Viktor Platan, 93, Finnish Olympic pentathlete.
Norma Redpath, 84, Australian artist.
Roxana Ng, 61, Canadian academic, cancer.
John C. Rule, 83, American historian.
Yuri Schmidt, 76, Russian lawyer and human rights activist, cancer.
Roy Sinclair, 68, English footballer (Watford).
Steven Utley, 64, American science-fiction writer, cancer.

13
Diogenes Allen, 80, American philosopher.
Bille Brown, 61, Australian actor (Oscar and Lucinda, Killer Elite, The Chronicles of Narnia: The Voyage of the Dawn Treader), bowel cancer.
Stanley Caine, 76, English actor (The Italian Job).
Andrea Carrea, 88, Italian road bicycle racer.
Jacki Clérico, 83, French businessman, owner of the Moulin Rouge, cancer.
Rodney Mims Cook, Sr., 88, American politician.
David Gibbs, 76, American politician, member of the Mississippi House of Representatives (since 1992), cancer.
Enzo Hernández, 63, Venezuelan baseball player (San Diego Padres, Los Angeles Dodgers), suicide.
Jürgen Himmelbauer, 54, Austrian politician.
Mykhailo Horyn, 82, Ukrainian politician, prisoner of conscience and member of Soviet dissidents movement.
Itaru Ishida, 33, Japanese Magic: The Gathering player.
Kari Jormakka, 53, Finnish architect, historian, theoretician, critic and teacher, heart attack.
Riki Kawara, 75, Japanese politician, Director General of the Defense Agency (1987–1988), pneumonia.
Deyan Kolev, 47, Bulgarian Olympic gymnast.
Sanivalati Laulau, 61, Fijian rugby union player.
Gordon Lee, 54, American comic book store owner, complications from a stroke.
H. Craig Lewis, 68, American politician, member of the Pennsylvania State Senate (19751995), heart attack.
Chia-Chiao Lin, 96, Chinese-born American applied mathematician and professor.
Benny Luke, 73, American-French actor and dancer.
Alfred K. Mann, 92, American physicist.
Gerald McKee, 83, American construction management executive.
Jack Recknitz, 81, German actor.
Jerry Sisk, Jr., 59, American gemologist, co-founder of Jewelry Television.
Rusi Surti, 76, Indian cricketer, complications from a stroke.
Katie Stewart, 78, British cookery writer.
Balagangadharanatha Swamiji, 67, Indian religious sect leader, multiple organ failure.
Joseph Syoz, 75, French Olympic boxer.
Geoff Thomas, 64, Welsh footballer (Swansea City).
Arthur Wightman, 90, American mathematical physicist (Wightman axioms).

14
Giorgio Alverà, 69, Italian world champion (1975) and Olympic bobsledder.
Conrad Bain, 89, Canadian-born American actor (Maude, Diff'rent Strokes, Mr. President), complications from a stroke.
Danny Beath, 52, British photographer and botanist, heart attack.
Yehudith Birk, 86, Israeli biochemist (Bowman–Birk protease inhibitor).
Yaakov Blau, 84, Israeli rabbi.
Neville Bonitto, 88, Jamaica cricketer.
Tony Conran, 81, Welsh poet and translator.
Paul Droubay, 86, American radio broadcaster (KDAB), fought the U.S. Federal Communications Commission over expanded area radio coverage.
Fred Flanagan, 88, Australian VFL football player (Geelong), Hall of Fame member (1998).
Prospero Gallinari, 62, Italian terrorist (Red Brigades).
John McKinlay, 80, American Olympic rower.
Maharani Gina Narayan, 82, British-born Indian royal.
Eric Norstad, 88, American potter and architect.
Vic Rowen, 93, American football coach (San Francisco State).
Jasuben Shilpi, 64, Indian sculptor, cardiac arrest.

15
Daphne Anderson, 90, British actress and singer.
Princess Margarita of Baden, 80, German aristocrat.
Wickrama Bogoda, 72, Sri Lankan movie actor.
Jennings Michael Burch, 71, American writer.
Maurice Camyré, 97, Canadian Olympic boxer.
Carlos Castillo Medrano, 39, Guatemalan politician, shot.
Chucho Castillo, 68, Mexican boxer, WBA and WBC Bantamweight Champion (1970–1971), heart attack.
Zakiah Daradjat, 86, Indonesian psychologist.
Aida Desta, 85, Ethiopian royal.
Daniel Edelman, 92, American public relations executive, founder of Edelman, heart failure.
Generous, 24, Irish Thoroughbred horse, winner of the Irish Derby, Epsom Derby and King George VI and Queen Elizabeth Stakes (1991).
Bill Glynn, 87, American baseball player (Philadelphia Phillies, Cleveland Indians).
George Gund III, 75, American sports franchise co-owner (San Jose Sharks, Cleveland Cavaliers), cancer.
Eifan Saadoun Al Issawi, 37, Iraqi politician, MP for Fallujah, bombing.
 Balthazar Korab, 86, Hungarian-born American architectural photographer.
Magomed Gadjievich Magomedov, 55, Russian judge, member of the Supreme Court of Dagestan, shot.
Susan Manning, 59, Scottish academic.
Ferenc Nádasdy, 75, Hungarian aristocrat, last male member of the House of Nádasdy.
Nagisa Oshima, 80, Japanese director and screenwriter (In the Realm of the Senses).
Michel Pollien, 75, French Roman Catholic prelate, Auxiliary Bishop of Paris (1996–2012).
Zurab Popkhadze, 40, Georgian footballer and manager, suicide by hanging.
Robert Gordon Robertson, 95, Canadian civil servant, 7th Commissioner of the Northwest Territories.
Aron Schvartzman, 104, Argentine chess master.
Clayton Silva, 74, Brazilian actor and comedian (A Praça é Nossa), cancer.
Nii Tackie Tawiah III, 72, Ghanaian royal, Ga Mantse (since 2006). (death announced on this date)
John Thomas, 71, American Olympic high-jumper.
Yuli Turovsky, 73, Russian-born Canadian conductor and cellist (I Musici de Montréal Chamber Orchestra).
Dharam Singh Uppal, 53, Indian international track and field athlete, cardiac arrest.
*Yang Baibing, 92, Chinese military leader and politician.

16
Wayne D. Anderson, 82, American baseball and basketball coach (University of Idaho).
Peter Barnes, 50, British pilot, helicopter crash.
Gerry Brisson, 75, Canadian ice hockey player (Montreal Canadiens).
André Cassagnes, 86, French electrical engineer, inventor of the Etch A Sketch.
Robert Citron, 87, American politician.
Burhan Doğançay, 83, Turkish artist and photographer.
Jake Froese, 87, Canadian politician, MP for Niagara Falls, Lord Mayor of Niagara-on-the-Lake.
Robert Charles Gleason, Jr., 42, American convicted murderer, execution by electric chair.
Noé Hernández, 34, Mexican Olympic silver medal-winning (2000) race walker, cardiac arrest.
Ralph B. Hodges, 82, American politician.
Sir Barry Holloway, 78, Australian-born Papua New Guinean politician, Speaker of the National Parliament (1972–1977).
Samson Kimobwa, 57, Kenyan long-distance runner, stomach ailment.
Yevdokiya Mekshilo, 81, Russian cross-country skier, Olympic champion (1964).
Gussie Moran, 89, American tennis player.
Isidro Pérez, 48, Mexican boxer, WBO Flyweight Champion (19901992). (body discovered on this date)
Pauline Phillips, 94, American advice columnist ("Dear Abby"), complications from Alzheimer's disease.
Kroum Pindoff, 97, Greek-born Canadian businessman and philanthropist.
James W. Plummer, 92, American aerospace engineer, United States Under Secretary of the Air Force (1973–1976).
Nic Potter, 61, British bassist (Van der Graaf Generator), pneumonia.
Perrette Pradier, 74, French actress, heart attack.
Glen P. Robinson, 89, American businessman, founded Scientific Atlanta.
Hōō Tomomichi, 56, Japanese sumo wrestler, heart disease.
Aslan Usoyan, 75, Georgian-born Russian mobster, shooting.
Dick Westcott, 85, Portuguese-born South African cricketer (Western Province, national team).

17
Mehmet Ali Birand, 71, Turkish journalist, columnist and documentarian, cardiac arrest.
Bill Albright, 83, American football player (New York Giants).
Ilmar Aluvee, 43, Estonian Olympic skier, fall.
Jakob Arjouni, 48, German author, cancer.
Tissa Balasuriya, 89, Sri Lankan Roman Catholic priest and theologian.
Claude Black, 80, American jazz pianist, cancer.
Robert F. Chew, 52, American actor (The Wire), heart attack.
Yves Debay, 58, Belgian journalist, shot.
Fernando Guillén, 80, Spanish actor.
Eric Handley, 86, British classical scholar.
Sophiya Haque, 41, English actress (Coronation Street, Wanted, House of Anubis), singer and dancer, cancer.
James Hood, 70, American civil rights pioneer, among first African Americans to register at the University of Alabama.
Sanjeewa Hulangamuwa, 57, Sri Lankan politician and businessman, heart attack.
Homayoun Khorram, 82, Iranian violinist, colorectal cancer.
Fred J. Lincoln, 75, American actor, director (The Last House on the Left) and pornographic director.
Linh Quang Viên, 94, Vietnamese army general.
Tony Martin, 70, Trinidadian-born American historian.
Paul McKeever, 57, British police officer, Chairman of the Police Federation of England and Wales, embolism.
Eng Abner Nangwale, 79, Ugandan politician.
John Nkomo, 78, Zimbabwean politician, Second Vice President (2009–2013), cancer.
John R. Powers, 67, American author (Do Black Patent Leather Shoes Really Reflect Up?), heart attack.
Guram Sagharadze, 84, Georgian actor.
Sumihiro Tomii, 63, Japanese Olympic skier.
Michael Triplett, 48, American journalist, cancer.
Lizbeth Webb, 86, English soprano and stage actress.

18
Martin Barbarič, 42, Czech footballer, suicide by gunshot.
Bobby Bennett, 74, American musician, member of singing group The Famous Flames.
Peter Boyle, 61, Scottish-born Australian association footballer. (death announced on this date) 
Walmor Chagas, 82, Brazilian actor (Xica da Silva, São Paulo, Sociedade Anônima), apparent suicide by gunshot.
Sean Fallon, 90, Irish association footballer (Celtic).
Jim Horning, 70, American computer scientist.
Ken Jones, 77, Welsh footballer. 
Wolfgang Ilgenfritz, 56, Austrian politician.
Alfons Lemmens, 93, Dutch footballer.
David Lewis, 85, Zimbabwean cricketer (Rhodesia).
Wilhelm Löwinger, 96, Austrian Olympic speed skater.
Jon Mannah, 23, Australian rugby league player (Cronulla Sharks), Hodgkin's lymphoma.
Lewis Marnell, 30, Australian skateboarder, diabetes.
Harold Marshall, 94, Canadian military veteran.
*Morné van der Merwe, 39, South African rugby union player (Western Province, Stormers), brain cancer.
Ron Nachman, 70, Israeli politician and Knesset member, cancer.
Borghild Niskin, 88, Norwegian Olympic alpine skier and Holmenkollen medalist.
Jacques Sadoul, 78, French writer and book editor.
Gordon Snee, 82, British abstract painter.
Theodore Stern, 100, American educator.
Lynn Willis, American game designer (Call of Cthulhu).

19
Toktamış Ateş, 68, Turkish academic (Istanbul University), political commentator and writer, multiple organ failure. 
Anatoly Bannik, 91, Ukrainian chess player.
Mehnaz Begum, 63, Pakistani singer.
Gayle Bluth, 87, Mexican Olympic basketball player.
Milt Bolling, 82, American baseball player (Boston Red Sox), complications from  heart surgery.
John Braheny, 74, American songwriter.
Nick Broad, 38, English football nutritionist (Birmingham City, Blackburn Rovers, Chelsea, Paris Saint-Germain), traffic collision.
Michael Colley, 74, American navy officer and politician.
Happy Fernandez, 74, American political activist and Philadelphia City Councilwoman (1992–1999), stroke.
Abderrahim Goumri, 36, Moroccan Olympic (2004, 2008) long-distance runner, traffic collision.
Viggo Hagstrøm, 58, Norwegian legal scholar.
Basil Hirschowitz, 87, American gastroenterologist. 
İsmet Hürmüzlü, 75, Iraqi Turkmen actor (Valley of the Wolves: Iraq), screenwriter and director.
Steve Knight, 77, American musician (Mountain) and councilman, complications from Parkinsons disease.
Taihō Kōki, 72, Japanese sumo wrestler, ventricular tachycardia.
Michel Las Vergnas, 72, French mathematician.
Li Minhua, 95, Chinese physicist, academician of the Chinese Academy of Sciences.
Jim Marking, 85, American college basketball coach (South Dakota State). 
Hans Massaquoi, 87, German-born American journalist and author. 
Steven Muller, 85, American educator, President of Johns Hopkins University (1972–1990), respiratory failure.
Stan Musial, 92, American Hall of Fame baseball player (St. Louis Cardinals), Alzheimer's disease.
Julia Penelope, 71, American linguist, author, and philosopher.
Mary Jane Phillips-Matz, 86, American music historian, heart failure.
Frank Pooler, 86, American choirmaster and composer.
Andrée Putman, 87, French interior and product designer.
A. Rafiq, 64, Indonesian singer and actor.
*Marcel Sisniega Campbell, 53, Mexican chess player and film director, heart attack.
John Trim, 88, British linguist.
Earl Weaver, 82, American Hall of Fame baseball manager (Baltimore Orioles), apparent heart attack.
Ian Wells, 48, English footballer (Hereford United).

20
Ron Fraser, 79, American Hall of Fame college baseball coach (University of Miami).
Richard Garneau, 82, Canadian sports journalist.
Matilde Lindo, 58, Nicaraguan feminist and activist, heart attack.
Pavlos Matesis, 80, Greek writer.
Donald Oesterling, 85, American politician.
Dolores Prida, 69, Cuban-born American advice columnist (Latina).
Toyo Shibata, 101, Japanese poet.
Helen Wyatt Snapp, 94, American aviator, complications of a broken hip.
Adusumilli Srikrishna, 58, Indian organic chemist.
Tracy Sugarman, 91, American illustrator.
John Melville Turner, 90, Canadian politician. 
Freddie Williams, 86, Welsh motorcycle speedway world champion (1950, 1953), stroke.

21
Kamal Basu, 94, Indian politician, Mayor of Calcutta (1985–1990).
Alden W. Clausen, 89, American banking executive, President of the World Bank (1981–1986), complications from pneumonia.
David Coe, 58, Australian businessman, suspected heart attack. 
Riccardo Garrone, 76, Italian entrepreneur, cancer.
Jean Giambrone, 91, American sportswriter (Times-Union), first female writer awarded full press credentials at The Masters, blood clot in lung.
Zina Harman, 98, British-born Israeli politician.
Donald Hornig, 92, American chemist, explosives expert, Manhattan Project member, teacher and presidential science advisor, President of Brown University (1970–1976).
Ahmet Mete Işıkara, 72, Turkish professor of geology and earthquake expert, respiratory failure.
Geoffrey Matthews, 89, British ornithologist.
Inez McCormack, 69, Northern Irish trade union leader and human rights campaigner, cancer. 
Jake McNiece, 93, American World War II paratrooper, leader of the Filthy Thirteen. 
Chumpol Silpa-archa, 72, Thai politician, Minister of Tourism and Sports (since 2008), Deputy Prime Minister (2011–2013), renal failure.
M.S. Udayamurthy, 85, Indian Tamil language writer.
Andrew Weekes, 72, Kittitian  cricket umpire.
Michael Winner, 77, British film director (Death Wish) and food critic.

22
Said Ali al-Shihri, 41-42, Saudi Al-Qaeda leader, drone strike.
Kevin Ash, 53, British motorcycling journalist, traffic collision.
Ignacio Barrios, 82, Mexican painter.
Robert Bonnaud, 83, French anti-colonialist historian.
William J. Breed, 84, American geologist.
Zulema Castro de Peña, 92, Argentine human rights activist (Mothers of the Plaza de Mayo).
John Cheng, 52, Singaporean getai performer and actor, apparent heart attack.
Jean-Léon Destiné, 94, Haitian-born American dancer and choreographer.
Leslie Frankenheimer, 64, American set decorator (Blade Runner, Star Trek: Voyager, Ben & Kate), leukemia.
Anna Litvinova, 29, Russian fashion model, won Miss Russia (Miss Universe competition) (2006), cancer.
George H. Ludwig, 85, American space scientist.
Günther Maritschnigg, 79, German Olympic wrestler. 
Lídia Mattos, 88, Brazilian actress, pneumonia.
Hinton Mitchem, 74, American politician, Alabama Senate (1979–1986, 1987–2011), Alzheimer's disease.
Jimmy Payne, 86, English footballer (Liverpool).
Ted Talbert, 70, American documentary filmmaker, heart attack.
Margareta Teodorescu, 80, Romanian chess player.
Lucyna Winnicka, 84, Polish actress.

23
Ismail al-Armouti, 80, Jordanian politician, Minister of Municipal and Rural Affairs (1976).
Ed Bouchee, 79, American baseball player (Philadelphia Phillies, Chicago Cubs, New York Mets).  
Józef Glemp, 83, Polish Roman Catholic cardinal, Archbishop of Warsaw (1981–2006) and Primate of Poland (1981–2009), lung cancer.
Jacques Grimonpon, 87, French footballer (Lille OSC, Le Havre AC, Girondins Bordeaux, Olympique Lyonnais).
Tom Jankiewicz, 49, American screenwriter (Grosse Pointe Blank).
Made Katib, 71, Malaysian Anglican prelate, Bishop of the Diocese of Kuching.
Janice Knickrehm, 87, American actress (Halloween: The Curse of Michael Myers).
Jan Ormerod, 66, Australian illustrator of children's books, cancer.
Lucien Paiement, 80, Canadian politician, Mayor of Laval (1973–1981).
Dolours Price, 61, Irish republican political activist and PIRA volunteer, toxic prescription drugs mix.
Mike Rashkow, 71, American songwriter and advertising executive.
Jonathan Rendall, 48, English author.
Juan Carlos Rosero, 50, Ecuadorian Olympic and professional cyclist.
Susan Douglas Rubeš, 87, Austrian-born Canadian actress.
Tatsuo Sato, 75, Japanese politician.
*Peter van der Merwe, 75, South African cricketer.
Jean-Félix-Albert-Marie Vilnet, 90, French Roman Catholic prelate, Bishop of Saint-Dié (1964–1983) and Lille (1983–1998).
John Wood, 62, Canadian Olympic canoeist, suicide.
Frank Zakem, 81, Canadian politician and businessman, Mayor of Charlottetown (1975–1978).

24
Yemi Ajibade, 83, Nigerian–born British playwright and actor. 
Kevin Ashley, 71, Australian rugby league player (Eastern Suburbs).
Zózimo Bulbul, 75, Brazilian actor (Quilombo, Sagarana: The Duel) and filmmaker, heart attack.
José Colomer, 77, Spanish Olympic field hockey player.
 Graeme Fellowes, 78, Australian football player.
Khuseyn Gakayev, 42, Chechen nationalist military leader, shot.
Emanuel R. Gold, American lawyer and politician.
Dave Harper, 74, English footballer.
Nurul Islam, 84, Bangladeshi physician and educator.
Miroslav Janů, 53, Czech footballer, heart attack.
Kristján Jóhannsson 83, Icelandic Olympic athlete.
Gottfried Landwehr, 83, German physicist.
Barbara Leonard, 88, American politician, Secretary of State of Rhode Island (1993–1995).
Jim Line, 87, American basketball player (University of Kentucky).
Umashanker Singh, 73, Indian politician, lung infection.
Richard G. Stern, 84, American writer, cancer.
Lucien Stryk, 88, American poet and translator.
Harry Taylor, 77, American baseball player (Kansas City Athletics).
Jim Wallwork, 93, British World War II glider pilot.

25
Martial Asselin, 88, Canadian politician, MP for Charlevoix (1958–1962; 1965–1972), Minister (1963), Senator (1972–1990) and Lieutenant Governor of Quebec (1990–1996).
Leila Buckley, 96, British poet, novelist and translator.
Rade Bulat, 92, Croatian politician and partisan.
Gregory Carroll, 83, American R&B singer (The Four Buddies, The Orioles) and songwriter ("Just One Look"), aneurysm.
Normand Corbeil, 56, Canadian composer (Double Jeopardy, Extreme Ops, The Statement, V), pancreatic cancer.
Kevin Heffernan, 83, Irish Gaelic football player and manager.
Max Kampelman, 92, American diplomat, heart failure.
Frank Keating, 75, English sports writer, pneumonia.
Irene Koumarianou, 82, Greek actress, cardiac arrest.
Aase Nordmo Løvberg, 89, Norwegian opera singer.
Lloyd Phillips, 63, South African-born New Zealand producer (Inglourious Basterds, Vertical Limit, Man of Steel), heart attack.
Pepe Pimentel, 83, Filipino television presenter. 
Shozo Shimamoto, 85, Japanese artist.
Cecil Womack, 65, American singer-songwriter (Womack & Womack).
Oleg Vassiliev, 81, Russian painter.

26
Peter Beales, 76, British rosarian, author and lecturer.
Ann Bartlett, 92, American politician and political campaign chairwoman, First Lady of Oklahoma (1967–1971). 
Leroy Bonner, 69, American funk singer and guitarist (Ohio Players), cancer.
Gökhan Budak, 45, Turkish academic administrator and professor of quantum physics, suicide.
Lesley Fitz-Simons, 51, Scottish actress (Take the High Road), cancer.
Christine M. Jones, 83, American politician, member of Maryland House of Delegates (1982–1994).
Sukekiyo Kameyama, 58, Japanese voice actor (Winnie-the-Pooh), pneumonia.
Gour Khyapa, 65, Indian Baul singer, traffic collision.
Stefan Kudelski, 83, Polish audio engineer, inventor of the Nagra recorder.
Hans Ulrich Lehmann, 75, Swiss classical composer.
Daurene Lewis, 69, Canadian politician, nation's first black female mayor.
Patricia Lovell, 83, Australian television host (Mr. Squiggle) and film producer (Picnic at Hanging Rock), liver cancer.
Hiroshi Nakajima, 84, Japanese physician, Director-General of the World Health Organization (1988–1998). 
Acer Nethercott, 35, British coxswain, Olympic silver medallist (2008) and two-time Boat Race winner, cancer.
Padma Kant Shukla, 62, Indian physicist, heart attack.
James Stewart, 78, Irish politician, chair of the Communist Party of Ireland (2001–2004).
Shōtarō Yasuoka, 92, Japanese writer.

27
Thakurdas Bang, 95, Indian Gandhian economist.
Ivan Bodiul, 95, Soviet politician, First Secretary of the Moldovan Communist Party (1961–1980), Deputy Chairman of the USSR Council of Ministers (1980–1985).
Éamon de Buitléar, 83, Irish filmmaker.
Harry L. Carrico, 96, American lawyer and state judge, Senior Justice of the Supreme Court of Virginia.
Geoffrey Connard, 87, Australian politician, member of the Victorian Legislative Council (1982–1996).
Joanne Conte, 79, American transgender politician.
Gérard Dufresne, 94, Canadian politician and military officer.
Lou Fitzgerald, 93, American professional baseball player, scout and manager.
Chuck Hinton, 78, American baseball player (Washington Senators, Cleveland Indians, California Angels).
M Sirajul Islam, 77, Bangladeshi politician.
Stanley Karnow, 87, American journalist and Pulitzer Prize-winning (1990) historian, heart failure.
John Makumbe, 63, Zimbabwean political scientist and activist.
Barney Mussill, 93, American baseball player (Philadelphia Phillies).
Phạm Duy, 91, Vietnamese songwriter.
Sally Starr, 90, American actress (The Outlaws Is Coming) and television personality.

28
Paul J. Achtemeier, 85, American biblical scholar.
Brian Brown, 79, Australian jazz musician.
Eddy Choong, 82, Malaysian badminton player.
Émmanuel Ducher, 41, French Olympic water polo player.
Trevor Elliott, 63, British geoscientist and professor.
Florentino Fernández, 76, Cuban boxer, heart attack.
Lonnie Goldstein, 94, American baseball player (Cincinnati Reds).
Charlie Green, 80, Scottish amateur golfer.
Hattie N. Harrison, 84, American politician, Member of the Maryland House of Delegates (since 1973).
Bernard Horsfall, 82, British actor (Doctor Who, Gandhi, Braveheart).
John Karlin, 94, South African industrial psychologist. 
Doug Kenna, 88, American football player.
Oldřich Kulhánek, 72, Czech painter and graphic designer, designer of Czech banknotes and postage stamps.
Michael D. Lett, 74, Grenadian politician, prostate cancer.
Herbert Loebl, 89, British businessman and philanthropist.
Keith Marsh, 86, English actor (Love Thy Neighbour).
Dan Massey, 70, American sexual freedom activist.
Victor Ntoni, 65-66, South African musician, heart attack.
Mark Palmer, 71, American diplomat, United States Ambassador to Hungary (1986–1990).
Ladislav Pavlovič, 86, Slovak footballer.
Ceija Stojka, 79, Austrian Romani writer, painter, musician and Holocaust survivor.
Earl Williams, 64, American baseball player (Atlanta Braves), leukemia.
*Xu Liangying, 92, Chinese physicist, translator, historian and philosopher.
Benedict Zilliacus, 92, Finnish writer.

29
Ferris Ashton, 86, Australian rugby league player (Eastern Suburbs).
Malcolm Brodie, 86, British sports journalist.
Kenneth Clark (priest), 90, English priest.
Kerry Goulstone, 76, Welsh priest.
Frank Hahn, 87, British economist (Hahn's Problem). 
Anselm Hollo, 78, Finnish poet and translator, pneumonia.
William Ingram, 72-73,  Welsh writer and actor.
Reg Jenkins, 74, English footballer (Rochdale).
Augusto César Leal Angulo, 81, Mexican politician and chemist, member of the Senate (2006–2012).
Louis Lesser, 96, American businessman.
Garrett Lewis, 77, American set decorator (Hook, Bram Stoker's Dracula, Glory).
Jan Lužný, 86, Czech plant-breeder.
Gordon H. Mansfield, 71, American military veteran, United States Deputy Secretary of Veterans Affairs.
John Martinis, 82, American politician.
Borislav Milošević, 78, Serbian diplomat, Yugoslav ambassador to Russia (1998–2000), heart-related problems.
Butch Morris, 65, American jazz cornetist, conductor and composer, lung cancer.
Said al-Muragha, 86, Palestinian militant (Fatah al-Intifada), cancer. 
László Nyers, 78, Hungarian Olympic wrestler.
Arif Peçenek, 53, Turkish footballer (MKE Ankaragücü) and manager, heart attack.
Hadiya Pendleton, 15, American student, shot.
Johan de Ridder, 86, South African architect.
Ferrol Sams, 90, American author and physician, natural causes.
Reinhold Stecher, 91, Austrian Roman Catholic prelate, Bishop of Innsbruck (1980–1997).
David Taylor, 78, British veterinarian and television personality (No. 73).
John Young, 76-77, Australian cyclist.

30
Herluf Andersen, 81, Danish Olympian.
Patty Andrews, 94, American singer, last surviving member of The Andrews Sisters, natural causes.
Alexandre Denguet Atiki, 76, Congolese politician.
Gamal al-Banna, 92, Egyptian author and scholar, pneumonia.
Frank Kell Cahoon, 78, American businessman and politician.
José Cardona, 73,  Honduran footballer, heart attack.
Sonaram Chutia, 98, Indian independence activist.
Harvey Einbinder, 86, American physicist and author.
Georg Gaertner, 92, German soldier and escapee.
Shirley Luhtala, 79, American baseball player.
Diane Marleau, 69, Canadian politician, MP for Sudbury (1988–2008) and government minister, colorectal cancer.
Ann Rabson, 67, American blues singer and musician (Saffire – The Uppity Blues Women), cancer.
Roger Raveel, 91, Belgian painter, pneumonia.
Christopher Van Hollen, 90, American diplomat, United States Ambassador to Sri Lanka and the Maldives (1972–1976), Alzheimer's disease.
George Witt, 81, American baseball player (Pittsburgh Pirates, Los Angeles Angels, Houston Colt .45's).

31
Rubén Bonifaz Nuño, 89, Mexican poet and classicist.
Amina Cachalia, 82, South African activist and politician.
Joseph Cassidy, 79, Irish Roman Catholic prelate, Archbishop of Tuam (1987–1994).
R. Gilbert Clayton, 90, American set designer (Armageddon, Batman & Robin, The Untouchables).
Nolan Frizzelle, 91, American politician, Member of the California State Assembly (1980–1992), heart failure.
Hassan Habibi, 76, Iranian politician and scholar, Minister of Justice (1985–1989); First Vice President (1989–2001), heart attack.
Sir Ron Hadfield, 73, British police officer, Chief Constable of West Midlands Police (1990–1996). 
Keith Joubert, 65, South African artist and conservationist.
Larry Killick, 90, American basketball player.
Bob Lacourse, 86, Canadian Olympic cyclist.
Mohammad Mahseiri, Jordanian politician, Member of the House of Representatives (2013), heart attack.
Brett Matthews, 50, South African cricketer, traffic collision.
Caleb Moore, 25, American snowmobile competitor, complications from a collision during competition.
*Jacques Nguyễn Văn Mầu, 99, Vietnamese Roman Catholic prelate, Bishop of Vĩnh Long (1968–2001).
Tony Pierce, 67, American baseball player (Kansas City/Oakland Athletics).
Timir Pinegin, 85, Soviet sports sailor and Olympic gold medallist (1960).
Edward Stankiewicz, 92, American linguist of Polish descent.
Ingo Swann, 79, American parapsychologist. 
Shail Upadhya, 77, Nepalese United Nations disarmament official, fashion designer and socialite.
Fred Whitfield, 75, American baseball player (Cleveland Indians).
Diane Wolkstein, 70, American storyteller, during emergency heart surgery.

References

2013-01
 01